This is a list of black superheroes that lists characters found in comic books and other media. The characters are superheroes depicted as black people.

Comic books

Adeolah

Continuity Comics

Daathrekh Publishing

Demond Comics

Dark Horse Comics

DC Comics

{{Herolist|name=Catspaw|alter=April Dumaka|teams=Legion of Super-Heroes|first=Legion of Super-Heroes (vol. 4) #33|year=1992|date=September|writer=|artist=}}

Tanya Spears Power Girl II

Black Manta

Val-Zod Superman of Earth-2 (New 52)

Dell Comics

Disney Comics

Dorkstorm

Eclipse Comics

Epic Comics

First Comics

Fleetway/Quality

The Guardian Line UMI

Icon Comics

Image Comics

Impact Comics

Innovation

Independent comics

Kitchen Sink

Lion Forge Comics

Lone Star Press

Malibu (Ultraverse)

Marvel Comics

 

Marvel UK

MC2

Megaton Publishing

Milestone Media

New Universe

Pacific Comics

Pikin Press

Random House/Identity Artists & Writers Group

Supreme Power

Ultimate Marvel

Urban Legend

Vertigo Comics

Wildstorm (ABC/Homage)

Valiant Comics

ZOOLOOK

Other media

Newspapers

Novels and anthologies

Webcomics

Television

Movies

Notes

Dark Horse Comics
A.Plexus was an ally of Nexus from Nexus: Executioner's Song #3DC Comics
A.Cal Durham was Aquaman's ally who was turned into Waterbreather by Black Manta
A1Amber was an ally of Jericho trained by Adeline Kane Wilson and an operative of Searcher's Inc.
B.Chunk was a Flash ally
C.Conjura used backwards magic like Zatanna.
D.Crystallex becomes a living crystal and morphs. In stasis at S.T.A.R. Labs San Francisco.
E.Centaur was the protector of the Realm from the Wizardworld series in Warlord
F.FerAlyse was a feral denizen of Chicago's Netherworld
G.Glenn Gammeron is an intergalactic bounty hunter from Mi'ran and an ally of the Martian Manhunter
H.Gus Gray was a replacement loader for The Haunted Tank.
I.Healer Randolph was one of Tomahawk's Rangers, an ex-slave turned folk healer
J.Jackie Johnson was an ex-heavyweight boxing champion, and an amalgamation of Jackie Robinson and Joe Louis. He was a member of Sgt. Rock's Easy Company.
K.Jim Corrigan was an African-American police officer and an ally of Jimmy Olsen and Black Lightning
L.Jody was an ally of Tomahawk.
M.Machiste was a sometimes ally of the Warlord
N.Martin Ellis woke from coma in Justice League Quarterly'' #17 with powers of Tempest
O.Mister Bones was the DEO regional director
P.Mohammed Ibn Bornu was a North African warrior hero.
Q.Molo represented Africa.
R.Nu'Bia was a Wonder Woman ally
S.Percival Hazard was the leader of Squad K and grandson of Ulysses Hazard. He was last seen in Action Comics Annual #13 2008.
T.Philippus was an Amazon ally of Wonder Woman.
U.Seraph was a US government agent.
V.Scrap had magnetic powers
W.Sela was an Atlantean warrior woman 3,000 years ago
W1.Shondra Kinsolving was a doctor with telekinetic healing abilities and an ally of Batman.
X.Sojourner was a member of Artemis' HellEnders.
Y.The Solution was a Teen Titans tryout.
Z.Sonik (Superman/Batman ally from World's Finest)
A1.Ted & Terri Trapper were private detectives
A2.Tina Ames had the power of "Bio-Energy" and could become living energy.
A3.Wilson Forbes was a Daily Planet reporter.
A4.Wyldeheart was an ally of Damage
A5.Zeke had super strength.

Dell Comics
A.Lobo, two issue run

Dorkstorm Notes
A.Dr. Blink Superhero Shrink

Eclipse Comics Notes
A.Polestar was the acrobatic female member of the New Wave
B.Roboto (cyborg member of Team Youngblood from The DNAgents universe)
C.Sabre was one of the first graphic novels.
D.Strike inherited the power harness from Sgt. Strike

The Guardian Line Comics Notes
A.Code was a Spirit styled vigilante

Image Comics Notes
A.American Pi was a supersmart heroine

Marvel Comics
A.The Black Musketeers were allies of the Black Panther
B.Wes Cassady is a construction publisherer who was bitten by a radioactive rabbit.

Marvel Comics UK
A.Afrikaa was a superhuman ally of Black Panther
B.Doctor Crocodile was an ally of Captain Britain

MC2 Notes
A.Fred was Stark's bodyguard (Jim Rhodes)

Milestone Media
A.D-Struct was an ally of Hardware.
B.Technique was a female version of Hardware.
C.Buck Wild was a Luke Cage parody.

New Universe Comics
A.Mutator was revealed as African American in the final issue.

Vertigo Comics Notes
A.Chullo was an ex-cop and empowered by The Nazz

Wildstorm Comics
A.Dhalua Strong was the wife of Tom Strong
B.Tesla Strong was the daughter of Tom Strong

Movies
A.Character was never fully mentioned by this name in the film.

See also
List of black animated characters
African characters in comics
Ethnic stereotypes in comics
List of Asian superheroes
List of Latino superheroes
List of black video game characters
List of Native American superheroes

References

External links

Lists of superheroes
Superheroes
superheroes
Afrofuturism